Stephanie Allynne is an American actress, writer, and comedian. She is best known for her roles in In a World... (2013), Dream Corp, LLC (2016), One Mississippi (2016–17), and The L Word: Generation Q (2019–present).

Biography
Allynne moved from southern California to Buffalo, New York, for some of her youth. She headed to Los Angeles at the age of 18 and joined the Upright Citizens Brigade. She performs regularly with ASSSSCAT, Wild Horses, and Last Day of School: The Text Message show. Allynne started making numerous appearances on television including The League, The Mindy Project, Happy Endings, 2 Broke Girls, Kroll Show, and Key & Peele. Allynne wrote and co-starred in One Mississippi with her wife Tig Notaro. The show was a loose autobiography about their lives. Allynne is developing an hour drama for HBO and is co-writing and producing the feature First Ladies for Netflix, starring Jennifer Aniston and Notaro.

Personal life
Allynne married comedian Tig Notaro on October 24, 2015. According to Allynne, before her relationship with Notaro she had never dated women, saying, "I was so into Tig and I was falling in love with her and I didn't know how to identify it because I thought I was straight." In June 2016, their twin sons were born via surrogate.

Filmography

Film

Television

References

External links 
 

21st-century American actresses
21st-century American comedians
Actresses from California
American film actresses
American television actresses
American women comedians
Place of birth missing (living people)
LGBT actresses
American LGBT actors
LGBT people from California
Living people
Year of birth missing (living people)